Třebívlice is a municipality and village in Litoměřice District in the Ústí nad Labem Region of the Czech Republic. It has about 80 inhabitants.

Administrative parts
Villages of Blešno, Dřemčice, Dřevce, Leská, Šepetely, Skalice and Staré are administrative parts of Třebívlice.

Notable people
Franz von Klebelsberg zu Thumburg (1774–1857), nobleman
Ulrike von Levetzow (1804–1899), Goethe's love; lived and died here

References

Villages in Litoměřice District